The Kellogg School of Management at Northwestern University (also known as Kellogg) is the business school of Northwestern University, a private research university in Evanston, Illinois. Founded in 1908, Kellogg is one of the oldest and most prestigious business schools in the world. Its faculty, alumni, and students have made significant contributions to fields such as marketing, management sciences, and decision sciences.

History

Early history (1908–1950) 
The school was founded in 1908 as Northwestern University's School of Commerce. It offered a part-time evening program. It was a founding member of the Association to Advance Collegiate Schools of Business, that sets accreditation standards for business schools. The school played a major role in helping to establish the Graduate Management Admission Test. Also, researchers associated with the school have made contributions to fields such as marketing and decision sciences. For instance, Walter Dill Scott, a pioneer in applied psychology, helped establish some of the earliest advertising and marketing courses in the first decade of the twentieth century. He went on to serve as president of Northwestern University from 1920 to 1939. More recently, Philip Kotler and Sidney J. Levy's groundbreaking 1969 Journal of Marketing article, "Broadening the Conception of Marketing," laid the foundations for a greatly expanded understanding of marketing. Similarly, Kotler's Marketing Management text has played a key role in deepening the field's scholarship.

In 1919, Ralph E. Heilman, a Northwestern graduate with a doctorate from Harvard, was appointed the dean of the school. And in the next year, the school launched a graduate program leading toward the Master of Business Administration degree, drawing nearly 400 students in its first two years.

In 1939, Homer Vanderblue became the fifth dean of the school. During immense resource shortages caused by World War II, Dean Vanderblue kept the school functioning and led it through its transition from technical specialization toward a broader managerial education.

Changes in focus and international expansion (1951 - 1978) 
In 1951, the school began offering executive education courses. The Institute for Management, a four-week summer program based in Evanston, expanded the following year to two sections. The program's success eventually led to it being expanded in Europe in 1965 with a similar program offered in Bürgenstock, Switzerland. In 1976, the school expanded its executive education offerings in Evanston, introducing a degree-granting program known as the Executive Management Program (EMP, today known as the Executive MBA Program). A watershed event in the school's history was the opening of the James L. Allen Center, home of the Kellogg executive education programs. The vision of Dean Donald P. Jacobs (deanship 1975–2001; on faculty in Finance Department since 1957), the Allen Center enlisted the help of significant business figures in the Chicago-area, most notably James L. Allen, a Kellogg alumnus and co-founder of consultancy Booz Allen Hamilton. The Allen Center's cornerstone was laid in 1978 while the facility officially opened Oct 31, 1979.

In 1956, the school was renamed the School of Business; little more than a decade later, in 1969, the school once again changed its name, this time to the Graduate School of Management, a designation that reflected the demand among the business community for sophisticated managers trained in both analytical and behavioral skills. Also, this training was oriented toward general management, rather than narrowly functional skills, as had mostly been the case in many business schools for much of the 20th century. The training was designed to provide management skills suitable for leadership roles whether in the corporate, public, or nonprofit sectors – rather than careers focused solely on traditional business. To reflect this change, the school in 1969 stopped issuing the MBA credential in favor of the MM, or master of management degree. A point of differentiation for nearly three decades, the school more recently returned to the traditional MBA.

These dramatic changes were predicated upon a key change under Dean John Barr (1965–1975): In 1966, Northwestern elected to discontinue its highly respected undergraduate program (the School of Business) to focus its energies solely on graduate education. The school decided to pursue a research-based faculty. It quickly attracted a number of world-class quantitative experts, many in the field of game theory, to build the school's Managerial Economics and Decision Sciences Department. This department was founded in 1967 and initially led by Professor Stanley Reiter.

Continued expansion: John L. Kellogg (1979–2008) 
In 1979, in honor of a $10 million gift made to the school on behalf of John L. Kellogg, son of W.K. Kellogg, the school was renamed as the J.L. Kellogg Graduate School of Management. The funds allowed the school to significantly expand its research and teaching mission by establishing three endowed professorships; two major centers of interdisciplinary research; four research professorships; and a large dormitory. Even before the Kellogg gift, the school had been expanding its research-focused faculty: In 1978 alone, the school added six additional "named" professorships and two new research professorships.

In 2001, its name was shortened to the Kellogg School of Management.

Recent history (2009–today) 
In June 2009, Kellogg announced that Dipak C. Jain would step down after eight years as dean and return to teaching. On September 1, 2009, Sunil Chopra, former Senior Associate Dean for Curriculum and Teaching and the IBM Distinguished Professor of Operations Management, assumed the role of interim dean while a search committee worked to find a permanent replacement. Later in 2009, Northwestern University announced plans to construct a new building at the northeast corner of its Evanston campus to serve as Kellogg's new home. The new facility, called the Global Hub, opened in March 2017 adjacent to Lake Michigan and includes classrooms, faculty offices, collaborative learning spaces, and administrative offices.

In March 2010, Kellogg announced that Sally Blount would replace Sunil Chopra as dean, starting in July. Blount was the dean of the undergraduate college, and vice dean of the Stern School of Business at New York University. Dean Blount launched ambitious marketing and capital campaigns. These started in 2011 with the Think Bravely campaign, and subsequently announced a new Inspiring Growth campaign in 2014. This campaign is focused on the dual meaning of creating economic value while increasing self-knowledge and insight.

On February 6, 2012, Blount unveiled a seven-year plan, Envision Kellogg, aimed at restructuring the business school and launching Kellogg to the top of global rankings. As of 2018, $365
million dollars of the campaign target of 350 million dollars have been raised. On July 12, 2018, Kathleen Hagerty was named interim dean while Kellogg searched for a new dean. In February 2019, Kellogg announced that Francesca Cornelli would succeed Hagerty as dean.

Campuses

The Kellogg School's full-time and Executive MBA facilities are situated along the shores of Lake Michigan in Evanston, Illinois, on Chicago's North Shore, while the school's evening and weekend MBA program is housed on Northwestern's Downtown Chicago campus in Wieboldt Hall, between the law and medical schools. The downtown campus is also on Lake Michigan to the east and close to Michigan Avenue to the west. In January 2006, Kellogg opened a new campus for its EMBA program for Latin American executives in Miami.

Students in the Kellogg full-time program take the majority of their classes at the Global Hub, which opened on March 28, 2017. This 415,000 square-foot building is located on the shores of Lake Michigan. Toronto-based Kuwabara Payne McKenna Blumberg Architects designed this building. The Global Hub is built-out in four directions surrounding two atriums and numerous other commons areas. The building includes a design lab with 3D-printing equipment and an art studio.

Academics

Admissions 
Kellogg was the first business school in the world to insist that all applicants be interviewed to assess their leadership potential and suitability for the Kellogg School's cooperative environment. As a result, in addition to grades, GMAT scores, professional achievement, and demonstrated leadership, 'fit' is an important part of the admissions equation at Kellogg.

Programs
Kellogg offers full-time MBA, Executive MBA, MMM (MBA + MSDI), JD-MBA, MBAi, MD-MBA, evening and weekend MBA, Master of Science in Management Studies programs, course offerings for programs such as MEM as well as Ph.D. programs in several fields, and non-degree executive education programs.

Full-time MBA
The regular MBA program at Kellogg requires two years to complete. Kellogg accepts the Graduate Record Examination in addition to the GMAT from applicants. Students may choose from seven majors including accounting, economics, finance, marketing, operations, strategy, and managing organizations. If a student does not elect a major "General Management" will appear on their transcript. In addition to majors, Kellogg offers "pathways" to students who want to build expertise in certain industries. These include data analytics, entrepreneurship, growth and scaling, healthcare, real estate, social impact, and venture capital & private equity.

One-year MBA
Kellogg offers a one-year MBA program for students who have already completed a specified list of prerequisite courses, including undergraduate-level financial accounting, statistics, finance, economics, marketing, and operations. The one-year program began in 1965 and has more than 3,500 graduates around the world. Program graduates include Robert Eckert '77, former chairman and CEO, Mattel; Richard Lenny '77, former chairman and CEO, the Hershey Company; and Thomas J. Wilson '80, chairman and CEO, Allstate. With the exception of the two-year MBA at London Business School, European MBA's are one year, as at INSEAD in France, IMD in Switzerland, IE Business School in Madrid and Oxford's Saïd Business School.

MBAi 

The MBA, Artificial Intelligence (MBAi) Program is an 15-month (5-Quarter) joint degree program between the Kellogg School of Management and the Robert R. McCormick School of Engineering and Applied Science. Students earn an MBA degree from Kellogg School of Management by the end of the program.

MMM
Graduates of the MMM program earn both an MBA from Kellogg and an MS in Design Innovation from the Segal Design Institute at the Robert R. McCormick School of Engineering and Applied Science. This seven-quarter program begins in the summer before the traditional fall start of a two-year program.

JD-MBA
In cooperation with the Northwestern Pritzker School Law, Kellogg offers a program that leads to earning a JD and an MBA in just three years. Students spend their first year in law school where they study the standard curriculum. During the first summer and second-year, students study entirely at Kellogg. The second summer students choose to devote their time to either law or business entirely. During the final year, most classes are spent at the law school, but students may take some electives at the business school.

Evening and weekend MBA
Kellogg offers an Evening & Weekend MBA (E&W MBA) program aimed towards students who continue to develop their careers as they pursue their MBA degree. Within the E&W MBA program, Kellogg offers both an evening program and a weekend program. The E&W MBA requires 20.5 credits to complete. Kellogg also offers an accelerated option for students who have previous academic or industry experience in MBA-relevant subjects like accounting, marketing, and corporate finance. The accelerated option only requires 15.5 credits to complete. Students in the evening program typically take two classes per quarter, which allows them to finish the program in 2.5 years. The program must be completed within five years of starting, which can be accomplished by taking one class every quarter or by a combination of taking multiple classes per quarter and taking some quarters off. Classes for the evening & weekend program are offered at the downtown Chicago campus located at Wieboldt Hall, but students can take classes at the main campus as well.

Executive MBA
Kellogg offers an Executive MBA program designed for senior and mid-career executives. Executives can choose between two campuses, Evanston and Miami, and also two schedules, one weekend a month or two weekends a month.

Ph.D. programs 
Kellogg awarded its first Doctor of Philosophy (Ph.D.) degree in 1927. Since then, more than 950 Kellogg Ph.D. alumni have gone on to positions within academia and business. Seven programs of study are offered: Accounting Information and Management, Finance, Management and Organizations, Management and Organizations and Sociology, Managerial Economics and Strategy, Marketing, and Operations Management. The program is full-time on the Evanston campus. Students typically graduate in five years.

Overseas exchange programs

In addition to the Kellogg School campuses in Evanston, Chicago, San Francisco and Miami, the Kellogg School partners with institutions in Asia, Europe, South America, Australia, the Middle East, and Canada.

Kellogg students have the opportunity to study abroad in the fall or winter of their second year on six continents. The exchange partner schools offer the chance to learn about business from a different perspective, experience another culture, and network with students, faculty, and professionals from around the world. The International Exchange Program at the Kellogg School was started in 1980 with a vision to promote a cultural interchange of ideas and provide a greater understanding of cross-cultural trade and business practices. Since that time, more than 1,000 Kellogg School students have participated in the exchange program with schools from over 20 countries, including Argentina, Australia, Brazil, Chile, China, Costa Rica, Denmark, France, Germany, Japan, Hong Kong, India, Israel, Italy, Mexico, Scotland, Singapore, South Africa, South Korea, Spain, Switzerland, The Netherlands, Thailand, and U.K.

Beginning in 1996, Kellogg established joint Executive MBA programs with the Recanati Graduate School of Management at Tel Aviv University in Israel; WHU – Otto Beisheim School of Management in Vallendar, Germany; Guanghua School of Management at Peking University in China; the School of Business and Management at the Hong Kong University of Science and Technology; INSEAD campuses in France and Singapore; and the Schulich School of Management at York University in Toronto.

The Kellogg EMBA program offers students the opportunity to complete an elective course during Live-In Week at one of the Kellogg School's Global Partner Institutions in Tel Aviv, Israel; Vallendar, Germany; Toronto, Canada; or Hong Kong.

Kellogg offers joint executive MBA degree programs with—and grant Kellogg degrees to—these schools:

School of Business and Management at The Hong Kong University of Science and Technology in Hong Kong
Recanati Graduate School of Management at Tel Aviv University in Israel
WHU – Otto Beisheim School of Management in Germany
Schulich School of Business at York University in Toronto, Canada
Guanghua School of Management at Peking University in Beijing, China

Student profile 
48% of the students in Kellogg's full-time MBA program for the Class of 2024 are women. Just four years prior, only 38% of the full-time MBA class was composed of women. 37% of the Class of 2024 consists of minorities. 38% of the Class of 2024 consists of international students. The Class of 2024 achieved an average GMAT score of 729. Average undergraduate GPA was 3.7 for the Class of 2024. 

Based on the school's 2022 employment statistics, 40% of full-time MBA graduates were employed in consulting, 21% in technology, and 16% in financial services.

Rankings

In the most recent rankings of U.S. business schools, Kellogg is ranked 3rd by U.S. News & World Report, In addition, Kellogg MBA has consistently been ranked 1st in Marketing by U.S. News & World Report.

Three of the Kellogg School's other executive MBA programs are also ranked 5th by the Financial Times in 2022. The Kellogg-HKUST Executive MBA Program at the Hong Kong UST Business School is ranked No. 2 in the world, the school's Kellogg-Schulich Executive MBA program at York University in Canada is ranked No. 33 in the world, while the school's Kellogg-WHU Executive MBA program at WHU Business School in Germany is ranked No. 22 in the world.

The Kellogg-HKUST Executive MBA Program consistently ranks in the No. 1 position; EMBA was ranked No. 1 in Canada by the Financial Times.

Student life
Students tend to be very active in impacting the local Evanston and Chicago communities, and frequently collaborate on philanthropic causes. One example combining the campus culture and passion for giving is the annual Charity Auction Ball, held each winter quarter. There are many cultural clubs at Kellogg, which represent diversity in the Kellogg community. Some notable clubs include the India Business Club, the Asia Management Association, the Africa Club and so on. 

Unlike many peer schools, Kellogg does disclose grades to recruiters. The issue of grade disclosure was last voted on by students in 2005, and a process exists whereby Kellogg students can vote to change the policy.

Notable people

Alumni 

Kellogg has an alumni network of over 67,000 graduates working in nearly every industry and endeavor. Alumni can participate in over 60 active regional alumni clubs and more than 20 special interest clubs. The Kellogg Alumni Council helps strengthen connections among alumni. In 2022, there were active KAC members in North America, Latin America, Europe, and Asia.

Current Kellogg students are encouraged to interact with alumni on a number of levels. Most recently, the evening & weekend MBA program introduced the Kellogg Alumni Mentorship Program (KAMP). KAMP asks current students and alumni to fill out a short survey and then matches mentors and mentees by areas of interest.  Alumni Clubs like The Kellogg Alumni Club of Chicago provide alumni with the opportunity to enrich their connections, careers, and lives through an ongoing array of social, professional development and networking events that are offered exclusively to Kellogg alumni living in the Chicago area.

Companies started by Kellogg alumni

Adzuna, Founded by Doug Monro, '02.
Arthur Andersen, Founded by Arthur E. Andersen.
Booz Allen Hamilton, Founded by Edwin G. Booz and James L. Allen.
Crate & Barrel, Founded by Gordon Segal.
Endure to Cure Foundation, Founded by Jason Sissel, '07.
Ethos Water, Founded by Peter Thum and Jonathan Greenblatt.
Fieldglass, Founded by Jai Shekhawat, '96.
Kaunteya, founded by Aniruddha Jetha, '26.
Kayak.com, Founded by Steve Hafner, '97.
One Acre Fund, Founded by Andrew Youn.
OpenTable, Founded by Chuck Templeton.
ValueAct Capital, Founder Jeffrey W. Ubben, '87.
ZS Associates, Founded by Andris A. Zoltners and Prabhakant Sinha.

Faculty

Arthur E. Andersen, founder of the auditing firm bearing his name, member of faculty between 1909 and 1922; member of the Northwestern University board of trustees from 1933 to 1934.
Bala V. Balachandran, J. L. Kellogg Distinguished Professor of Accounting and Information Management
Efraim Benmelech, Harold L. Stuart Professor of Finance. 
Timothy Calkins
Janice Eberly, James R. and Helen D. Russell Distinguished Professor of Finance.
Christopher Galvin, served as the chairman and chief executive officer of Motorola from 1997 to 2003.
Shane Greenstein, an expert on the business economics of computing, communications, and the internet and the chair of the Management and Strategy Department from 2002 to 2005.
Ravi Jagannathan, Chicago Mercantile Exchange/John F. Sandner Professor of Finance.
Benjamin Jones, former Rhodes Scholar, former senior economist for macroeconomics for the White House Council of Economic Advisers, innovation and economic development researcher.
Dean Karlan
Philip Kotler, #4 management guru of all time as ranked by the Financial Times and marketing scholar.
Marvin Manheim, William A. Patterson Distinguished Professor of Transportation.
Dale T. Mortensen, Awarded the Nobel Prize in Economics in 2010 for his work on the search and matching theory of frictional unemployment.
J. Keith Murnighan, Harold H. Hines Jr. Distinguished Professor of Risk Management.
Roger Myerson, faculty between 1976 and 2001; winner of the 2007 Nobel Prize in Economics.
Sergio Rebelo
Paola Sapienza, included in the Thompson Reuters list of the most influential scientific minds in 2014, 2015, and 2016.
Mark Satterthwaite, A.C. Buehler Professor in Hospital and Health Services Management.
Mohanbir Sawhney, a pioneer in the field of technology management, and selected as one of the 25 most influential people in e-Business as ranked by Businessweek in May 2000.
Walter D. Scott, former CEO of Ameriprise Financial
Joseph A. Swanson, professor, businessman, writer
Brian Uzzi, Richard L. Thomas Professor of Leadership. He is best known for his work in the fields of sociology, network science, the science of science, and complex systems.
Robert J. Weber, the Frederic E. Nemmers Professor of Decision Sciences.

See also
List of business schools in the United States
List of United States business school rankings
List of Big Ten business schools

References 

 
Northwestern University
Business schools in Illinois

Educational institutions established in 1908
1908 establishments in Illinois